KiwiSAT, an amateur radio satellite developed by AMSAT-ZL, is to be New Zealand's first satellite.  It is being designed and built by New Zealand radio amateurs supported by Massey University (Auckland) and various corporate sponsors.

Overview
The Satellite was built from scratch because of the impacts of ITAR restrictions/bans on technology sharing and was mothballed for a few years during the period of uncertainty and is now being prepared for flight. The key activity is testing and selecting the best batteries to replace the existing batteries.  The design life expectancy of this "bird" is in excess of seven (7) years and past AMSAT Satellites have continued to function well beyond a decade.

The Satellite, slightly larger than a basketball, is designed to connect with amateur radio stations worldwide, and to carry out experimental work in small satellite Attitude Determination and Control (ADAC)

There are three functions on board the Satellite:

1) Satellite Attitude Control Experiment for Massey University 

2) Climate Change Research 

3) Amateur Radio Communications Transponder.

Launch planning is underway. The Launch partner has yet to be agreed. However the team is exploring both local (NZ) and international launch opportunities.

KiwiSAT is an amateur radio satellite but does not have an OSCAR designation until after it is launched.

External links
 KiwiSAT home page
 KiwiSAT joins space race 18 Jan 2003
 AMSAT-ZL home page

Amateur radio satellites
Telecommunications in New Zealand
Satellites of New Zealand
2020s in spaceflight